Channel Islands Beach is an unincorporated community in Ventura County, California, United States consisting of three historic neighborhoods: Hollywood Beach, Hollywood by the Sea, and Silver Strand Beach. This densely populated narrow  along the coastal edge of the Oxnard Plain was subdivided using the glamor of Hollywood to sell lots in the mid 1920s since the sand dunes had been used for movies. Adjacent development has left this sandy beachfront neighborhood hemmed in by Channel Islands Harbor and Naval Base Ventura County. The harbor mouth separates them into two communities resulting in a round-about travel route around the harbor between them although the Channel Islands Beach Community Services District provides local utilities services to the entire neighborhood. The Special-purpose district has an elected Board of Directors which provides a forum for the unique concerns of the community. Lying immediately adjacent but outside the corporate boundaries of the City of Oxnard and the City of Port Hueneme, they are governed by the county Board of Supervisors.

The population of this residential community was 3,103 at the 2010 census, down from 3,142 at the 2000 census. For statistical purposes, the United States Census Bureau has defined Channel Islands Beach as a census-designated place (CDP).

Geography 
The census definition of the area may not correspond to local understanding of the area. This unincorporated coastal community overlooks the Santa Barbara Channel. Oxnard Beach Park is immediately upcoast of Hollywood Beach and separates the community from the Oxnard neighborhood of Oxnard Shores. Three subdivision maps created the town lots (from north to south and the year recorded): Hollywood Beach (1924), Hollywood by the Sea (1926), and Silver Strand (1925). The mouth of the harbor was constructed over the shoreline portion of the Hollywood-by-the-Sea subdivision. A few of the lots remained on the north side of the harbor mouth with the intact Hollywood Beach subdivision. Although still unincorporated, this neighborhood is adjacent to the harbor and additional housing, both of which are in the City of Oxnard. The portion of the community on the south side of the mouth is more isolated with only one road providing access to the community. A small portion of the Hollywood-by-the-Sea subdivision touches the shore with a much large portion remaining a distinct tract of homes. The Silver Strand Beach subdivision is along most of the shoreline south of the harbor entrance which is near but without access to the Port of Hueneme.

The area is within the Hueneme School District.

Climate
This region experiences warm (but not hot) and dry summers, with no average monthly temperatures above .  According to the Köppen Climate Classification system, Channel Islands Beach has a warm-summer Mediterranean climate, abbreviated "Csb" on climate maps.

Demographics

2010
The 2010 United States Census reported that Channel Islands Beach had a population of 3,103. The racial makeup of Channel Islands Beach was 2,712 (87.4%) White, 27 (0.9%) African American, 16 (0.5%) Native American, 108 (3.5%) Asian, 6 (0.2%) Pacific Islander, 103 (3.3%) from other races, and 131 (4.2%) from two or more races. Hispanic or Latino of any race were 402 persons (13.0%).

The Census reported that 3,103 people (100% of the population) lived in households, 0 (0%) lived in non-institutionalized group quarters, and 0 (0%) were institutionalized.

There were 1,352 households, out of which 318 (23.5%) had children under the age of 18 living in them, 609 (45.0%) were opposite-sex married couples living together, 112 (8.3%) had a female householder with no husband present, 84 (6.2%) had a male householder with no wife present.  There were 112 (8.3%) unmarried opposite-sex partnerships, and 15 (1.1%) same-sex married couples or partnerships. 363 households (26.8%) were made up of individuals, and 105 (7.8%) had someone living alone who was 65 years of age or older. The average household size was 2.30.  There were 805 families (59.5% of all households); the average family size was 2.75.

The population was spread out, with 523 people (16.9%) under the age of 18, 261 people (8.4%) aged 18 to 24, 775 people (25.0%) aged 25 to 44, 1,105 people (35.6%) aged 45 to 64, and 439 people (14.1%) who were 65 years of age or older.  The median age was 44.8 years. For every 100 females, there were 111.7 males.  For every 100 females age 18 and over, there were 112.9 males.

The homeowner vacancy rate was 3.4%; the rental vacancy rate was 9.5%.  1,631 people (52.6% of the population) lived in owner-occupied housing units and 1,472 people (47.4%) lived in rental housing units.

2000
As of the census of 2000, there were 3,142 people, 1,362 households, and 784 families residing in the CDP. The racial makeup of the CDP was 90.39% White, 1.11% African American, 0.45% Native American, 1.91% Asian, 0.22% Pacific Islander, 2.93% from other races, and 2.99% from two or more races. Hispanic or Latino of any race were 9.29% of the population.

There were 1,362 households, out of which 24.5% had children under the age of 18 living with them, 41.9% were married couples living together, 10.1% had a female householder with no husband present, and 42.4% were non-families. 26.7% of all households were made up of individuals, and 4.0% had someone living alone who was 65 years of age or older. The average household size was 2.31 and the average family size was 2.72.

In the CDP, the population was spread out, with 18.1% under the age of 18, 7.1% from 18 to 24, 39.1% from 25 to 44, 26.3% from 45 to 64, and 9.4% who were 65 years of age or older. The median age was 38 years. For every 100 females, there were 107.4 males. For every 100 females age 18 and over, there were 108.9 males.

The median income for a household in the CDP was $58,306, and the median income for a family was $60,577. Males had a median income of $53,083 versus $39,946 for females. The per capita income for the CDP was $34,088. About 6.2% of families and 7.3% of the population were below the poverty line, including 9.0% of those under age 18 and 1.3% of those age 65 or over.

See also
List of beaches in California

References

Census-designated places in Ventura County, California
Geography of Oxnard, California
Census-designated places in California
Populated coastal places in California
Beaches of Ventura County, California
Neighborhoods in Ventura County, California